Charles Isaac and Lizzie Hunter Moore Anderson House is a historic home located at Commerce, Scott County, Missouri. It was built in 1902, and is a -story, Free Classic Queen Anne style frame dwelling measuring 61 feet by 41 feet.  It has a hipped roof with prominent front gable and dormers.  It features a wrap-around porch with nine Doric order columns.  Also on the property are the contributing garage (1905) and tool shed.

It was added to the National Register of Historic Places in 2006.

References

Houses on the National Register of Historic Places in Missouri
Queen Anne architecture in Missouri
Houses completed in 1902
Buildings and structures in Scott County, Missouri
National Register of Historic Places in Scott County, Missouri